Chintamani Malviya (born 8  January 1969) is a member of the Bharatiya Janata Party and has won the 2014 Indian general elections from the Ujjain (Lok Sabha constituency).

Currently, he is member of Standing Committee on Human Resource Development as well as member of Consultative Committee, Ministry of Finance and Corporate Affairs.

He had published a booked called Deendayal Upadhyay Darshan Aur Darshnik.

References

1969 births
Living people
People from Ujjain
Vikram University alumni
Lok Sabha members from Madhya Pradesh
Bharatiya Janata Party politicians from Madhya Pradesh
India MPs 2014–2019